Nick George (born 25 September 1982) is a British former professional basketball player.

College career
George played four seasons of college basketball at Virginia Commonwealth University scoring a total of 1546 points. With the Rams he would win the 2004 Colonial Athletic Association regular season and tournament en route to his only NCAA tournament appearance.

Professional career
George started his professional career in 2006 with Italian club Benetton Treviso before moving to second division Imola. George would later play for Alicante, Dunkerque and Casale Monferrato before being forced to retire due to knee problems in 2010. However, after successful rehabilitation and a brief period with former team Casale Monferrato towards the end of the 2010–2011 season, George signed for newly promoted Legadue team Pallacanestro Sant'Antimo.

On 12 December 2012, it was announced that he had signed a contract with his hometown team Manchester Giants of the British Basketball League, after being released by former club Lugano Tigers due to injury.

International
George was part of the Great Britain national basketball team that qualified and competed in the 2009 Eurobasket championship in Poland.

References

1982 births
Living people
A.S. Junior Pallacanestro Casale players
English men's basketball players
BCM Gravelines players
CB Lucentum Alicante players
Forwards (basketball)
Lugano Tigers players
Pallacanestro Treviso players
Plymouth Raiders players
Sportspeople from Manchester
VCU Rams men's basketball players
British expatriate basketball people in Switzerland
English expatriate sportspeople in Switzerland
British expatriate basketball people in Spain
English expatriate sportspeople in Spain
British expatriate basketball people in Italy 
English expatriate sportspeople in Italy
British expatriate basketball people in France
English expatriate sportspeople in France
British expatriate basketball people in the United States
English expatriate sportspeople in the United States
Black British sportsmen